Kaga-Bandoro is a market town and capital of the Nana-Grébizi prefecture of the Central African Republic. It represents the seat of the Roman Catholic Diocese of Kaga–Bandoro.

History 

On 25 December 2012 rebels from Séléka coalition took control of Kaga-Bandoro. On 14 December 2015 rebels announced independence of Republic of Logone in Kaga-Bandoro. In September 2016 Kaga-Bandoro was reported to be under joint control of MPC and FPRC armed groups. In December 2019 four armed groups were reportedly present in Kaga-Bandoro: MPC, FPRC, Anti-balaka and UPC. 

On 10 April 2021, the FACA and their Russian allies entered the city of Kaga-Bandoro. This has caused the fleeing of the rebel forces previously occupying the town to the north towards Kabo and Batangafo.

Climate 
Köppen-Geiger climate classification system classifies its climate as tropical wet and dry (Aw).

See also 
 List of cities in the Central African Republic
 Prefectures of the Central African Republic

References 

Sub-prefectures of the Central African Republic
Populated places in the Central African Republic
Populated places in Nana-Grébizi